Relapsing linear acantholytic dermatosis is a cutaneous condition characterized by relapsing linear erosions and crusting, histologically identical to Hailey–Hailey disease. It is not to be confused with transient acantholytic dermatosis.

See also 
 Linear porokeratosis
 List of cutaneous conditions

References 

Genodermatoses